Dermomurex cunninghamae is a species of sea snail, a marine gastropod mollusk in the family Muricidae, the murex snails or rock snails.

Description
The shell has a maximum length of 18.5mm. The spire is high and acute, consisting of two and a half tightly wound, convex nuclear whorls and five postnuclear whorls.

Distribution
This species occurs in the Pacific Ocean from Mexico to Panama.

References

 Merle D., Garrigues B. & Pointier J.-P. (2011) Fossil and Recent Muricidae of the world. Part Muricinae. Hackenheim: Conchbooks. 648 pp. page(s): 223

External links
 

Gastropods described in 1964
Dermomurex